Para Olvidarte de Mí (English: To Forget About Me) is the sixth and final studio album by Mexican pop band RBD, a group that gained popularity from Televisa's teenage-oriented TV series, Rebelde. The album was released on March 10, 2009 in Mexico and on March 24, 2009 in the United States. The album belongs to the musical genres of Latin pop and pop rock, with a melodic dance-pop styling.

For promotion purposes, only one single was released from the album, the title-track "Para Olvidarte de Mí". The single's music video was compiled from footage of RBD's previous music videos and live performances.

Background and production
The group announced in October 2008 that Para Olvidarte de Mí was slated to be RBD's last studio album, as the group was disbanding. Group member Maite Perroni announced during an interview that the recording of the farewell album had concluded in November 2008. The album was recorded in Mexico City, under the production of Armando Ávila, Carlos Lara and MachoPsycho.

Following on the footsteps of Empezar Desde Cero, RBD band member Dulce María co-wrote two songs out of the 13 that are on the album. The two compositions are "Más Tuya Que Mía", a song that speaks about the end of a romantic relationship, and "Lágrimas Pérdidas", which deals with the hope of starting again after having gone through disillusion in a relationship.

Release

Contrary to the group's previous albums, Para Olvidarte de Mí is considered a limited edition, as only 40,000 copies were released for sale in each country. Being that the group officially disbanded after the final show of their Gira Del Adios on December 21, 2008, the album was released after the disbandment of the group. In doing so, no promotion other than the release of the single was made for the album. The anticipation for RBD's last release caused that the lead single from the album, the "title track", to be leaked onto the Internet on January 26, 2009. The whole album was eventually also leaked onto the Internet on March 1, 2009, more than a week before its official release date. On March 10, 2009, RBD regrouped with the exception of Herrera who had work commitments,  and held a press conference in Mexico, where they officially presented the album.

Much later, in 2010, Dulce María herself presented through her official Twitter account a contest for RBD fans to create a music video made up of the best moments of the disbanded sextet, which would eventually be uploaded to her official YouTube channel. A few weeks after the contest was opened, a new song titled "Llévame" was revealed together with the winning fan-made video. The song was composed by Dulce María and fellow ex-RBD band member Alfonso Herrera, likely during their final recording sessions for Para Olvidarte de Mí.

Promotion

Para Olvidarte de Mí (single)

"Para Olvidarte de Mí" was released as the first and sole single off the album. The song was not only the final single released from the group, but was also released before the disband. The song was released for airplay and as a digital download on January 26, 2009. No promotion whatsoever was given for the song nor an actual music video resulting in its failure to chart on any music charts. The melancholic song is the group's goodbye single to their fanbase.

The music video for "Para Olvidarte de Mí" premiered on the Mexican TV network Televisa. The video is composed of behind the scenes footage, live footage from the group's numerous performances and scenes from the telenovela Rebelde. The music video served as a way to look back upon RBD's incredible trajectory and for fans to remember all the moments they shared together with the group.

Awards and nominations

Reception

Critical reception
Jason Birchmeier from the online music guide AllMusic gave Para Olvidarte de Mí a 2 out of 5 star review. He considered that the album had a "heavy emphasis on emotional ballads [...] oriented toward the group's core fan base rather than the Latin pop mainstream", while highlighting some of the album tracks like "Camino Al Sol", "¿Quién Te Crees?" and "Puedes Ver Pero No Tocar". Birchmeier ended his review by stating: "As it happened, however, RBD overran the course of their popularity and were left to bid farewell to a greatly diminished fan base, not to mention an otherwise uncaring Latin pop mainstream that had grown increasingly weary of the group as the years passed and the novelty wore thin."

Commercial performance
Para Olvidarte de Mí is considered RBD's least successful studio album, as only 40,000 copies of the album were distributed in each country in which it was released, and also did not have any significant promotion.

In North America, the album found its greatest success in the group's native Mexico, where it debuted at #7 on the Mexican Albums Chart, compiled by AMPROFON, and later peaked at #3 on its second week of release. However, the album only managed to chart in Mexico for 11 weeks. In the United States, the album peaked at #6 on the Billboard Top Latin Albums chart, and at #3 on Billboard Latin Pop Albums, charting in both rankings for six weeks.

In South America, the album managed to chart in Argentina, where it debuted at #83 on the Argentine Albums Chart, compiled by CAPIF, and later peaked at #10 in its second week on the chart.

In Europe, Para Olvidarte de Mí managed to enter the albums chart in Spain (ranked by PROMUSICAE) at #17 and stayed on the ranking for 8 weeks.

Track listing

 Notes
  signifies a co-producer

Personnel 
Credits adapted from the album's liner notes.

Recording locations

Igloo Music Studios (Burbank, California)
Cosmos Studios (Mexico City, Mexico)

Studio 19 (Mexico City, Mexico)
Fishhead Studios (Gothenburg, Sweden)

Mixing locations

Igloo Music Studios (Burbank, California)
Cosmos Studios (Mexico City, Mexico)

Sound Decision (Austin, Texas)

Mastering location
 Precision Mastering (Los Angeles, California)

Vocals

RBD – main vocals, choruses
Armando Ávila – choruses

Carlos Lara – choruses
Carlos Murguía – choruses

Musicians

Armando Ávila – acoustic guitar, B-3, bass, drums, electric guitar, keyboards, Mellotron, piano
Jimmy Jonson – bass
Greg Bissonette – drums 
Nick Baxter – guitars
Michkyn Boyzo – guitars
Mark Goldberg – guitars

Javo González – guitars 
Iván Machorro – guitars
Francisco Oroz – guitars
Ruy Folguera – keyboards
Jon Gilutin – keyboards
Czech National Symphony Orchestra – strings

Production

Fernando Grediaga – A&R
Camilo Lara – A&R
Armando Ávila – arrangements, direction, mixing engineer, producer, programming, recording engineer
Gustavo Borner – arrangements, co-producer, mastering, mixing engineer, recording engineer
Ruy Folguera – arrangements, programming
Iván Machorro – arrangements, programming
Juan Carlos Moguel – arrangements, mixing engineer, recording engineer
Justin Moshkevich – arrangements, programming, recording engineer
Nick Baxter – arrangements, programming, recording engineer
Luis Luisillo M. – associate producer
Carolina Palomo – coordination
Carlos Lara – direction, producer, vocal direction
MachoPsycho – direction, producer
Emilio Ávila – executive producer
Pedro Damián – executive producer 
hulahula.com.mx – graphic design
Manuel Luna – hairstyling
B.J. Murphy – hairstyling 
Televisa En Vivo – management
Alfonso Castro – make-up
Minerva García – make-up
Víctor Guadarrama – make-up
Don Tyler – mastering
Yvonne Venegas – photography
Nicolás Ortiz – production assistant
Daniel Borner – production coordinator
Mónica Jiménez – production coordinator
Rotger Rosas – recording assistant
Fernando Roldán – recording engineer
Enrique Ávila – studio manager (Cosmos Studios)
Carlos Murguía – vocal direction
Carlos Valdés – vocal direction

Charts

Weekly charts

Release history

References

2009 albums
RBD albums